Necklace of Venus is a cutaneous condition characterized by a background hyperpigmentation with superimposed white macules on neck associated with syphilis.

See also 
 Poikiloderma of Civatte
 List of cutaneous conditions

References 

Disturbances of human pigmentation